is a Japanese football player. He played for Japan national team.

Club career
Yamagishi was born in Chiba on May 3, 1983. He joined JEF United Ichihara (later JEF United Chiba) from youth team in 2002. He debuted as right midfielder in 2003. From 2005, he became a regular player as left midfielder as Shinji Murai successor. The club won the champions 2005 and 2006 J.League Cup. He moved to Kawasaki Frontale in 2008. Although the club won the 2nd place in 2008 and 2009 J1 League, his opportunity to play decreased and he moved to Sanfrecce Hiroshima in 2010. The club won the champions 2012 and 2013 J1 League. His opportunity to play decreased from 2014. Although the club won the champions 2015 J1 League, he could hardly play in the match. He moved to J3 League club Oita Trinita in 2016. The club won the champions in 2016 and was promoted to J2 League. He moved to Regional Leagues club Vonds Ichihara.

National team career
In November 2003, Yamagishi was selected Japan U-20 national team for 2003 World Youth Championship. He played 2 matches.

Yamagishi made his senior national team debut on October 4, 2006, in a friendly match against Ghana. He was a member of the Japan team for the 2007 Asian Cup finals. He played two games in the competition. He played 11 games for Japan until 2008.

Club statistics

1Includes Japanese Super Cup, FIFA Club World Cup and J.League Championship.

National team statistics

National team career statistics

Appearances in major competitions

Honors and awards

Individual
 J1 League Fair Player Award: 2006

Team

JEF United Chiba
 J.League Cup (2): 2005, 2006

Sanfrecce Hiroshima
 J1 League (2): 2012, 2013, 2015
 Japanese Super Cup (2): 2013, 2014

Oita Trinita
 J3 League (1): 2016

References

External links

 
 
Japan National Football Team Database

1983 births
Living people
Association football people from Chiba Prefecture
Japanese footballers
Japan youth international footballers
Japan international footballers
J1 League players
J2 League players
J3 League players
JEF United Chiba players
Kawasaki Frontale players
Sanfrecce Hiroshima players
Oita Trinita players
Vonds Ichihara players
2007 AFC Asian Cup players
Association football midfielders